The Dr. Frank Finney House, at 608 Belleview Ave. in La Junta, Colorado, was built in 1899.  It was a work of architect Walter Dubree and is designed in a generally Edwardian vernacular style but with Colonial Revival details.  Also known as the Hofmann-Collins House, it was listed on the National Register of Historic Places in 1984.

It was deemed significant as the largest historic house and the "most lavishly detailed" in La Junta.  It was home of Dr. Frank Finney (d.1919) who was the Santa Fe Railroad's district surgeon and served as president of the Colorado Medical Society.  The owners in 1984 were doctors Hofmann and Collins.

References

External links 

Houses on the National Register of Historic Places in Colorado
Colonial Revival architecture in Colorado
Houses completed in 1899
Houses in Otero County, Colorado
National Register of Historic Places in Otero County, Colorado